The Afghanistan cricket team toured India in June 2018 to play a one-off Test match against the India cricket team. It was Afghanistan's first Test since they were awarded Test status by the International Cricket Council (ICC) in June 2017. India won the match in two days by an innings and 262 runs. Afghanistan were dismissed twice in the same day, only the fourth time this has happened in Tests. It was India's biggest win by an innings in Tests, and they became the first Asian team to win a Test match inside two days.

After the match, India's captain Ajinkya Rahane said that it is just the beginning for Afghanistan, and playing more Tests and first-class cricket would improve the side. Phil Simmons, Afghanistan's coach, said that the team were "by no means happy' with their performance", but believes they will get there with further hard work.

Background
In late 2017, it was announced that Zimbabwe would be Afghanistan's first Test opponents, but the tour was confirmed as being limited overs matches only. In December 2017, the Board of Control for Cricket in India (BCCI) and the Afghanistan Cricket Board (ACB) confirmed that the match would take place in 2018, with the exact date and venue to be announced at a later date. In January 2018, both the ACB and the BCCI confirmed the Test would be played in June at the M. Chinnaswamy Stadium in Bengaluru. It was the first time a Test match was played in June in India.

Squads

India's captain Virat Kohli announced that he would miss this Test match as he elected to play for Surrey County Cricket Club. This was in preparation for India's tour to England the following month. However, a neck injury ruled him out of playing for Surrey in England. Ajinkya Rahane was named as India's captain for the Test match in Kohli's absence.

Prior to the final squad selection, Afghanistan had a team of thirty players warming up for the match in Greater Noida. On 29 May 2018, the ACB announced a sixteen-man squad for the Test match, with Asghar Stanikzai named as the captain. Afghan bowler Rashid Khan said that "it will be a big day for cricket in Afghanistan" and he could not wait to become a Test cricketer. He later added that the match will be "a test of patience" and that he might end up taking no wickets.

Ahead of the Test, Wriddhiman Saha was ruled out of India's squad due to injury, and was replaced by Dinesh Karthik. Mohammed Shami was also ruled out of India's squad after failing a fitness test, being replaced by Navdeep Saini.

Before the Test, both captains commented on the significance of the fixture. Asghar Stanikzai, Afghanistan's captain, said that "to be playing our first Test against India is a great honour and we hope to give a good account of ourselves". India's captain, Ajinkya Rahane, said "it's a privilege to be playing in Afghanistan's first Test match" adding that it will be an historic moment for the Afghan team.

Test series

Only Test

Notes

References

External links
 Series home at ESPN Cricinfo

2018 in Afghan cricket
2018 in Indian cricket
International cricket competitions in 2018
Afghan cricket tours of India